Badshah or Baadshah may refer to:

 Padishah, or Badshah, a superlative sovereign title of Persian origin

People
 Badshah (rapper) (Aditya Prateek Singh Sisodia, born 1984), Indian rapper
 Badshah Begum (1703–1789), first wife and chief consort of the Mughal emperor Muhammad Shah
 Abdul Ghaffar Khan (1890–1988), Pashtun independence activist also known as Bādshāh Khān
 Akbar Badshah (born 1985), Pakistani first-class cricketer 
 Ali Badshah, Canadian actor, writer, producer and director

Arts and entertainment
 Badshah (1954 film), a Bollywood film
 Badshah (1964 film), an Indian Hindi-language film
 Baadshah (1999 film), an Indian Hindi-language action comedy
 Baadshah (2013 film), an Indian Telugu-language action comedy
 Baadshah (soundtrack)

See also
Badushah, Indian dessert
Padishah (disambiguation)